This is a list of basketball players who are the leaders in career games played in the National Basketball Association (NBA).
Statistics accurate as of March 9, 2023.

See also

List of National Basketball Association career minutes played leaders
List of National Basketball Association seasons played leaders
List of NBA players who have spent their entire career with one franchise
List of oldest and youngest National Basketball Association players

Notes

References

External links
NBA & ABA Career Leaders and Records for Games – BasketballReference.com

Games